Gaylord K. Swim (December 17, 1948 – February 5, 2005) was an American businessman. He was the founder of the Sutherland Institute and a prominent community leader.

Biography

Early life
Swim was a native of Carmel, California.  He attended Pomona College and then transferred to Brigham Young University (BYU).  He joined the Church of Jesus Christ of Latter-day Saints (LDS Church) while a student at BYU.  In 1970 he graduated with a BS in business.  He then served a mission for the church in the Germany Central Mission (later called the Germany Düsseldorf Mission).  After his return from his mission he earned an M.A. in political science from BYU.

Career
Early on Swim worked for Dominick & Dominick.  He and his mother Kay Swim were involved with the publication of Stephen R. Covey's best-selling book The 7 Habits of Highly Effective People. Covey noted his thanks for their contribution in the Acknowledgements section of the book. In the late 80's, Swim established a wealth management company Pillar Capital Advisors. He also was a co-founder of the Rural Health Management Corporation which  operates the Central Valley Medical Center in Nephi, Utah. He was active in the community, and served as the chairman of a committee which studied a proposed division of Alpine School District in northern Utah County. Swim and the majority of the committee ultimately recommended against dividing the school district, citing concerns about the impact on school budgets and property tax rates.

Philanthropy
Swim was active in philanthropic efforts. He was a long-time member of the Philanthropy Roundtable. He also served on the boards of several other non-profit organizations, including the State Policy Network, American Heritage School (Utah), Deseret International Foundation, Enterprise Mentors International, and the Council for National Policy.

Personal life
In 1973, he married Lauralyn Bankhead in the Salt Lake Temple. They had five children. In the LDS Church, he served in various positions including as a bishop and a counselor in a stake presidency. He died of brain cancer at the age of 56.

References

External links
 Gaylord Swim at the Sutherland Institute

1948 births
2005 deaths
20th-century Mormon missionaries
American leaders of the Church of Jesus Christ of Latter-day Saints
American Mormon missionaries in Germany
Brigham Young University alumni
Converts to Mormonism
Deaths from brain tumor
People from Carmel-by-the-Sea, California
Latter Day Saints from California
Latter Day Saints from Utah
Latter Day Saints from New York (state)
Pomona College alumni